Alison Sim (born 1961) is an English historian and author, specialising in the Tudor period.

She lectures on Tudor food for the Mary Rose Trust and has worked at the Tower of London and Hampton Court Palace.

Selected publications
Pleasures & Pastimes in Tudor England
The Tudor Housewife
Food & Feast in Tudor England
 Life in Tudor Palaces & Houses
 Masters and Servants in Tudor England

References

1961 births
Living people
Tudor England
20th-century English historians
21st-century English historians
Historians of England
21st-century English women writers
20th-century English women writers
British women historians